Pirate Radio USA is a 2006 documentary film written and directed by Jeff Pearson, with musical director Mary Jones. Its running time is 82 minutes.

Summary
The film showcases illegal radio, or pirate radio in America. DJs Him and Her (Pearson and Jones respectively) travel throughout the country meeting and interviewing radio pirates, taking action against the FCC and the World Trade Organization's 1999 Seattle conference.

Cast
 Jeff Pearson, DJ Him
 Mary Jones, DJ Her
 Stephen Dunifer, himself
 Mark Alan, himself
 Oregon Senator Ron Wyden, himself
 Pam Hairston, lawyer, FCC Compliance and Information Bureau
 Petri Dish
 DJ Realtime
 DJ Sara Zia

Production

Soundtrack
As well as starring in the film, Mary Jones was also the music director. The soundtrack featured songs from Jello Biafra and Utah Phillips.

Release
While using low-budget and basic filming technology, this film was a success internationally, and was shown at the Bermuda International Film Festival, the Victoria Independent Film Video Festival, and the Austin Film Festival. It also won "Most Original Documentary" at the Wine Country Film Festival and "Best Feature-Judges Award" at the Zion Independent Film Festival.

References

External links
 
 http://www.bside.com/films/pirateradiousa
 
 

2006 films
2006 documentary films
American documentary films
Pirate radio
American independent films
Documentary films about radio
2006 independent films
2000s English-language films
2000s American films